Chrzanowski (feminine: Chrzanowska; plural: Chrzanowscy) is a Polish-language surname. Notable people with the surname include:

 Adam Chrzanowski (born 1999), Polish footballer
 Anna Dorota Chrzanowska (fl. 1675), Polish heroine of the Polish–Ottoman War
 Bernard Chrzanowski (1861–1944), Polish politician
 Hanna Helena Chrzanowska (1902–1973), Polish nurse
 Ignacy Chrzanowski (1866–1940), Polish literary historian
 Jan Samuel Chrzanowski (died 1688), Polish military officer
 Katarzyna Chrzanowska (born 1963), Polish actress
 Kazimierz Chrzanowski (born 1951), Polish politician
 Sławomir Chrzanowski (born 1969), Polish cyclist
 Tomasz Chrzanowski (born 1980), Polish speedway rider
 Wiesław Chrzanowski (1923–2012), Polish politician
 Wojciech Chrzanowski (1793–1861), Polish general

See also
 
 

Polish-language surnames